The North Atlantic League was the name of two minor baseball leagues. The first was a Class D affiliated system that operated from 1946 until 1950, and the second was an independent minor league that played from 1995 until 1996. Three of that league's franchises joined the Northeast League after the folding of the North Atlantic League.

Many ballplayers with major league experience played in the league, including Tom Marsh, Carl Sawatski, Bill Burich and Lonnie Goldstein, among others.

List of teams

Cities represented

1946–1950
Bangor, PA: Bangor Pickers 1949; Bangor Bangors 1950 
Berwick, PA: Berwick Slaters 1950 
Bloomingdale, NJ: Bloomingdale Troopers 1946–1948 
Carbondale, PA: Carbondale Pioneers 1946–1948, 1950; Carbondale Pioneer Blues 1949 
Hazleton, PA: Hazleton Mountaineers 1949; Hazleton Dodgers 1950 
Kingston, NY: Kingston Dodgers 1947 
Lansdale, PA: Lansdale Dukes 1948 
Lebanon, PA: Lebanon Chix 1949–1950 
Mahanoy City, PA: Mahanoy City Bluebirds 1946–1947; Mahanoy City Brewers 1948–1950 
Nazareth, PA: Nazareth Cement Dusters 1946; Nazareth Tigers 1947; Nazareth Barons 1948–1950 
Newburgh, NY: Newburgh Hummingbirds 1946 
Nyack, NY: Nyack Rockies 1946–1948 
Peekskill, NY: Peekskill Highlanders 1946–1949 
Stroudsburg, PA: Stroudsburg Poconos 1946–1950 
Walden, NY: Walden Hummingbirds 1946

1995-1996 
 Altoona, PA: Altoona Rail Kings 1996 
 Lynn, MA: Massachusetts Mad Dogs 1996 
 Mountaindale, NY: Catskill Cougars 1996 
 Nashua, NH: Nashua Hawks 1995–1996 
 Newark, NY: Newark Barge Bandits 1995–1996 
 Niagara Falls, NY: Niagara Falls Mallards 1995 
 Welland, ON: Welland Aqua-Ducks 1995–1996

League Championship titles

1946–1950
1946 – Peekskill Highlanders
Playoffs: Peekskill 4, Stroudsburg 2Carbondale 4, Nazareth 1
Finals: Peekskill 4, Carbondale 3
1947 – Kingston Dodgers
Playoffs: Peekskill 4, Kingston 1Carbondale 4, Mahanoy City 3
Finals: Carbondale 4, Peekskill
1948 – Peekskill Highlanders
Playoffs: Peekskill 4, Bloomingdale 3Carbondale 4, Mahanoy City 3
Finals: Carbondale 4, Peekskill 0
1949 – Stroudsburg Poconos
Playoffs: Stroudsburg 4, Mahanoy City 3Peekskill 4, Lebanon 1
Finals: Stroudsburg, Peekskill 2
1950 – Lebanon Chix
Playoffs: Lebanon 4, Carbondale 3Stroudsburg 4, Hazleton 3
Finals: Lebanon 3, Stroudsburg 2Series was stopped by bad weather

1995–1996

League Championship titles
 1995 – Newark Barge Bandits
Non-Playoff Schedule
 1996 – Massachusetts Mad Dogs
Playoff: Catskill 2, Massachusetts 0

External links
Baseball Reference
North Atlantic League chart
Digitalballparks.com North Atlantic League Index and Photographic Gallery

Defunct minor baseball leagues in the United States
Defunct independent baseball leagues in the United States
Baseball leagues in Pennsylvania
Baseball leagues in New York (state)
Baseball leagues in New Jersey
Baseball leagues in New Hampshire
Sports leagues established in 1946
Sports leagues disestablished in 1950
Sports leagues established in 1995
Sports leagues disestablished in 1996